The Motto River is an  river in Spotsylvania and Caroline counties in the U.S. state of Virginia.  It is a tributary of the South River, and via the Mattaponi and York rivers is part of the Chesapeake Bay watershed.

See also
List of rivers of Virginia

References

USGS Hydrologic Unit Map - State of Virginia (1974)

Rivers of Virginia
Tributaries of the York River (Virginia)
Rivers of Spotsylvania County, Virginia
Rivers of Caroline County, Virginia